Monika Dukarska (born 18 October 1990) is a Polish-born Irish rower. She competed for Ireland alongside Aileen Crowley in the women's coxless pair event at the 2020 Summer Olympics.

Dukarska grew up in Poznań, and moved with her family to Ireland when she was sixteen, settling in Killorglin, County Kerry.

References

External links
 
 Monika Dukarska at Rowing Ireland
 
 

1990 births
Living people
Irish female rowers
Olympic rowers of Ireland
Rowers at the 2020 Summer Olympics
Sportspeople from Poznań
Naturalised citizens of Ireland
Polish emigrants to Ireland